Gadelha is a Brazilian surname that may refer to the following people: 
Cláudia Gadelha (born 1988), Brazilian mixed martial artist 
Fabiano Gadelha (born 1979), Brazilian football midfielder 
Breno Silva (Breno Gadelha Silva, born 1986), Brazilian football midfielder 

Portuguese-language surnames